Buckinghamshire County Council was the upper-tier local authority for the administrative county and later the non-metropolitan county of Buckinghamshire, in England, the United Kingdom established in 1889 following the Local Government Act 1888. The county council's offices were in Aylesbury.

The county council borders changed several times, most notably in 1974 when the council lost the territory of Colnbrook, Datchet, Eton, Horton, Slough and Wraysbury to Berkshire. In 1997 it lost the Borough of Milton Keynes, which became a unitary authority remaining within the ceremonial county of Buckinghamshire.

The council consisted of 49 councillors. It had been controlled by the Conservatives since the reorganisation of local government in 1974. For the 2013 elections, the number of seats was reduced from 57 to 49 following the 2012 changes in division boundaries.

In March 2018 Sajid Javid, the Communities Secretary at the time, backed proposals to replace the county council and the four district councils (Aylesbury Vale, Chiltern, South Bucks, and Wycombe) with a single unitary authority, named Buckinghamshire Council. As of January 2019, Chiltern, South Bucks and Wycombe district councils had launched legal action against the "undemocratic" plans for how the unitary authority was to be set-up. Nevertheless, the Buckinghamshire Structural Changes Order 2019 was enacted, which as of 1 April 2020 abolished the County Council and the four district councils and created a single district council as a unitary authority, called 'Buckinghamshire Council'.

History

On 12 March 2020, the last meeting of the County Council took place, during which the council celebrated 131 years of service.

County architect Fred Pooley designed the council's headquarters building, New County Hall, a 12-storey tower block at Aylesbury built in 1966 which became known as "Fred's Fort" and less flatteringly as "Pooley's Folly".

Notable members
Frederick Verney (1846–1913), member from 1889 to 1907
Tonman Mosley, 1st Baron Anslow (1850–1933), Chairman from 1904 to 1921
Sir William Carlile, 1st Baronet (1862–1950)
William Joseph Ashby (1885–1953)
Sir Henry Aubrey-Fletcher, 6th Baronet (1887–1969)
Sir Aubrey Ernest Ward (1899–1987), Chairman from 1963 to 1974
Edward Curzon, 6th Earl Howe (1908–1984), Vice-Chairman 1974 to 1978
John Darling Young (1910–1988)
Sir Ralph Verney, 5th Baronet (1915–2001)
Guthrie Moir (1917–1993), member from 1949 to 1975
Brian White (1957–2016), later member of parliament for Milton Keynes

References

External links

 
Local government in Buckinghamshire
Former county councils of England
1889 establishments in England
2020 disestablishments in England
Local authorities in Buckinghamshire
Major precepting authorities in England
Leader and cabinet executives